Koei Co., Ltd. was a Japanese video game publisher, developer, and distributor founded in 1978. The company is known for its historical simulation games based on the novel Romance of the Three Kingdoms, as well as simulation games based on pseudo-historical events.

The company has also found mainstream success in a series of loosely historical action games, the flagship titles of which are the Dynasty Warriors and Samurai Warriors series, also known as the Musō series. Koei also owns a division known as Ruby Party, which focuses on otome games.

On April 1, 2009, Koei merged with Tecmo to form the Tecmo Koei Holdings holding company. Koei changed its name to Tecmo Koei Games on April 1, 2010 by absorbing Tecmo, and again on July 1, 2014, to Koei Tecmo Games.

History
Koei was established in July 1978 by Yōichi Erikawa (also known as Kou Shibusawa) and Keiko Erikawa. Yoichi was a student at Keio University, and when his family's rural dyestuffs business failed, he decided to pursue his interest in programming. The company has remained located in the Hiyoshi area of Yokohama.

The company initially focused on personal computer sales and made-to-order business software. In 1982, the company released the erotic title (eroge) , which was an early role-playing adventure game with color graphics, owing to the eight-color palette of the PC-8001 computer. It became a hit, helping Koei become a major software company. In March the same year Koei released Underground Exploration, the earliest known Japanese RPG. In 1983 it released , a historical strategy game set during the Sengoku period of Japanese history.

In 1988, Koei established a North American subsidiary, Koei America Corporation, in California. This subsidiary localized Koei games for export to all territories outside Japan, as well as producing original games and concepts with the leadership of designer Stieg Hedlund, like Liberty or Death, Celtic Tales: Balor of the Evil Eye, Gemfire and Saiyuki: Journey West. After Hedlund's departure, this subsidiary ceased game development in 1995, focusing instead on localization, sales and marketing.

Though none of Koei's historical simulations achieved mass market success, they acquired a loyal cult following. This following allowed Koei to remain profitable, since they could reliably predict how many copies of their games would sell (especially important during the cartridge era, when a surplus of unsold cartridges on a single game was often enough to bankrupt a company).

A Canadian subsidiary, Koei Canada, Inc. was established in early 2001, and a European subsidiary, Koei Limited was established in early 2003 in Hertfordshire, United Kingdom. Koei also maintains subsidiaries in mainland China, Korea, Taiwan and Lithuania. Recently, Koei created a Singapore branch for game development such as Sangokushi Online.

All Koei operations in English in turn ceased in 2012, with the previously unannounced closing of Koei's North American support forums and website. They resumed in 2016, with the English language PC release of Romance of the Three Kingdoms XIII.

Koei's Ruby Party division specializes on games labeled as Neoromance: GxB dating sims, usually with extra side-quests. Out of the three Neoromance series, the best known is Angelique, which has been in production since 1994. Harukanaru Toki no Naka de is a newer Neoromance hit, with many sequels and an anime television series based on it. The newest game in the series, Kin'iro no Corda, is gaining popularity partially because the manga series it was based on, has been recently licensed by Viz for English language publishing. It gaining more popularity though, and an anime television series based on it began airing in October 2006. A sequel was also released on the PlayStation 2 in March 2007.

On September 4, 2008, Koei announced that it was in talks to purchase ailing competitor Tecmo. They agreed in November 2008 to merge on April 1, 2009 to form Tecmo Koei Holdings. On January 26, 2009 the two companies approved the merger, the holding company formed on April 1, 2009 as planned.

On April 1, 2010, Koei merged with Tecmo and combined both elements as one under the name Tecmo Koei Games. Koei's subsidiaries in the United States, Europe and Korea already had their names changed months before the Japanese parent. On March 15, 2010, the developing operations of Koei and Tecmo were spun off as new companies  under the names of Koei Co, Ltd and Tecmo Co, Ltd respectively, but they were integrated into Tecmo Koei Games the following year, on April 1, 2011.

Games by Koei 
Koei has built a large base of franchises, and has developed on various consoles and computers. Below is a list of game series developed by Koei.

Action
Bladestorm: The Hundred Years' War, an action/strategy game based on the Hundred Years' War between England and France. Released for PlayStation 3, PlayStation 4 and Xbox 360.
BoBoiBoy Galactic Heroes – In association with Koei, and based on the Malaysian TV series, BoBoiBoy Galaxy, to be released on Google Play.
Croc: Legend of the Gobbos. The Japanese version of the Croc games distributed by Koei were released for the PlayStation.
Crimson Sea was released for Xbox in 2002, whereas its sequel was released for PlayStation 2 in 2004.
Destrega, a 1 vs 1 fighter game for the PlayStation.
Dynasty Warriors 1–9 (as well as expansions Xtreme Legends for 3–8, Empires for 4–8, plus a Game Boy Advance, a Nintendo DS and three PlayStation Portable games)  (真・三國無双 Shin-Sangoku Musō; spin-off of Romance of the Three Kingdoms).Dynasty Warriors: Gundam, for the PlayStation 3 and Xbox 360, it is based on the mechanics of Dynasty Warriors and Samurai Warriors, only using the Mobile Suit Gundam franchise as its base. (ガンダム無双 Gundam Musō).Fist of the North Star: Ken's Rage for the PlayStation 3 and Xbox 360.Fist of the North Star: Ken's Rage 2 for the PlayStation 3, Xbox 360, and Wii UHyrule Warriors for Wii U, a Dynasty Warriors style game for The Legend of Zelda franchise.Mystic Heroes for the GameCube and PlayStation 2.Nioh for PlayStation 4.One Piece: Pirate Warriors for the PlayStation 3.Prey the Stars, released for the Nintendo DS.Samurai Warriors, Samurai Warriors 2, Samurai Warriors 3, and Samurai Warriors 4 (as well as an Xtreme Legends expansion to both, and Empires expansion to 2, a PSP game, Samurai Warriors: State of War, and Samurai Warriors: Katana for the Wii.) (戦国無双 Sengoku Musō). Many spinoffs of this have been created including Derby Musou and Samurai  Warriors Chronicles series.Stop That Roach!, an action/puzzle game released in 1994 for Game Boy.Tamashii no Mon Dante no Shinkyoku yori  (魂の門 ダンテ「神曲」より Gate of Souls ~ From Dante's Divine Comedy), an action game inspired by Dante's Divine Comedy released on NEC PC-9801 and FM Towns.Toukiden: The Age of Demons, a monster-hunting action role-playing game.Trinity: Zill O'll Zero, for the PlayStation 3.Warriors: Legends of Troy is a Koei Canada game which was announced at E3 2009.Warriors Orochi for the PlayStation 2, PSP, PC and Xbox 360, it is the first Koei crossover title, featuring characters from the Dynasty Warriors and Samurai Warriors games. (無双OROCHI).WinBack, a third-person shooter game for Nintendo 64 and PlayStation 2.WinBack 2: Project Poseidon, a third-person shooter game for PlayStation 2 and Xbox.Warriors All-Stars for PlayStation 4 and PlayStation Vita, a Dynasty Warriors style game mixing characters from Koei's various franchises, similar to Warriors Orochi.Warriors Orochi 3 Hyper, for the Wii U

 History simulation Bandit Kings of Ancient China – Released on the Nintendo Entertainment System, MS-DOS, Amiga &  Macintosh.Genghis Khan series.
Liberty or Death – Based on the American Revolutionary war.
Nobunaga's Ambition series – published on various platforms.
Romance of the Three Kingdoms I to XIV released on the MSX, MSX2, NES, SNES, Genesis, Amiga, PC-Engine CD-ROM, Sega Saturn, PS1, PS2 and PC – turn based strategy games
Rise of the Phoenix – Based on the wars of the early Han and Chu dynasties in China, released on the SNES.

Strategy
Aerobiz Supersonic – Airline simulator
BoBoiBoy Galactic Heroes – From In Association With Koei and Based on the BoBoiBoy go to Galaxy released in Google Play
Celtic Tales: Balor of the Evil Eye – Medieval fantasy simulator
Dynasty Tactics
Dynasty Tactics 2
Gemfire – Medieval fantasy simulator
Genghis Khan
Kessen
Kessen II
Kessen III
L'Empereur – Turn-based strategy game released on the Nintendo Entertainment System
P.T.O.: Pacific Theater of Operations
P.T.O. II: Pacific Theater of Operations
P.T.O. IV: Pacific Theater of Operations
Naval Ops: Warship Gunner 2
Nobunaga's Ambition series – published on various platforms
Operation Europe: Path to Victory – A strategy game set in Europe during World War II
Romance of the Three Kingdoms
Teitoku no Ketsudan (PTO: Pacific Theater of Operations in North America) – Pacific War strategy games

Executive Series
Aerobiz and Aerobiz Supersonic – Airline business simulator series
Top Management – Business simulator series
Top Management II – Released on the Super Famicom, Microsoft Windows PC and NEC PC-9801
Winning Post – Thoroughbred horse racing management and horse breeding simulator series
Pop Cutie! Street Fashion Simulation – fashion design and business management simulation
Leading Company – Video cassette recorder business simulator

Neo-romance
Angelique
Harukanaru Toki no Naka de
Kin'iro no Corda
Neo Angelique ~Abyss~

RPGs
Bandit Kings of Ancient China
Brandish (Super NES port)
Danchi Zuma no Yuuwaku
Inindo: Way of the Ninja (for Super NES) Also part of Rekoeition series
Nobunaga's Ambition
Saiyuki: Journey West
Sangokushi Eiketsuden, Sangokushi Koumeiden, Sangokushi Sousouden (as Tactical RPG)
Soul Master
Opoona

Sports
G1 Jockey
G1 Jockey 4 2007
Fatal Inertia
Se-Pa 2001
Winning Post 7 Maximum 2007
Yanya Caballista: City Skater

Music
Gitaroo Man (As well as a PlayStation Portable version called Gitaroo Man Lives!)

Rekoeition
Ishin no Arashi – First game of Rekoeition series.

 – Based on the Age of Discovery.

Adventure
Saihai no Yukue (采配のゆくえ)

Erotic 
Danchi Zuma no Yuuwaku
Night Life

Games published by Koei in Europe
Disgaea series
Dynasty Warriors 3
La Pucelle: Tactics
Atelier Iris series
Phantom Brave
Makai Kingdom: Chronicles of the Sacred Tome
Colosseum: Road to Freedom
Persona 3 and Persona 3 FES

References

External links
 

Companies based in Yokohama
Defunct video game companies of Japan
Video game companies established in 1978
Koei Tecmo
Video game publishers
Video game development companies
Japanese companies established in 1978
Video game companies disestablished in 2010
Japanese companies disestablished in 2010